Dmitar (1321) or Dimitrije (Димитрије) was a Serbian nobleman that served kings Stefan Milutin and Stefan Dečanski (r. 1321–31), with the title of kaznac (chamberlain, camerarius). The title-holder was among the foremost at the Serbian court, taking care of state finances. Stefan Dečanski, after becoming king, allowed Dmitar to donate (as a metochion) his village of Brčele (near Bar, Montenegro) to the Monastery of St. Nicholas on the Vranjina island.

References

Sources

14th-century Serbian nobility
Kaznac
People of the Kingdom of Serbia (medieval)
14th-century deaths
13th-century births
Medieval Montenegro